St. John's African Methodist Episcopal Church is a historic church at 2261 East 40th Street in Cleveland, Ohio.

It was built in 1908 and added to the National Register in 1982.

References

External links
 Official website

Churches completed in 1908
20th-century Methodist church buildings in the United States
Churches in Cleveland
African Methodist Episcopal churches in Ohio
Churches on the National Register of Historic Places in Ohio
Gothic Revival church buildings in Ohio
National Register of Historic Places in Cleveland, Ohio
Central, Cleveland
1908 establishments in Ohio